John V. Magnabosco (1906 – October 15, 1956) was an American football player and coach.  He served as the head football coach at Ball State Teachers College—now known as Ball State University—from 1935 to 1952, compiling a record of 68–46–14.  From 1931 to 1934, he was the head football coach at Clinton High School in Clinton, Indiana, where he won three state championships.  Magnabosco died of a heart attack at the Ball State gymnasium on October 15, 1956 in Muncie, Indiana.

Head coaching record

High school

College

References

External links
 

1906 births
1956 deaths
Ball State Cardinals football coaches
Indiana Hoosiers football players
College track and field coaches in the United States
High school football coaches in Indiana
People from Clinton, Indiana
Coaches of American football from Indiana
Players of American football from Indiana